Andreas Mikkelsen (born 22 June 1989) is a Norwegian rally driver. He is currently competing in the World Rally Championship-2 for Toksport World Rally Team. He previously drove for the factory teams of Volkswagen, Citroën and Hyundai in the World Rally Championship, finishing third in the drivers' standings in 2014, 2015 and 2016. His current co-driver is Torstein Eriksen.

He is a two-time Intercontinental Rally Challenge champion, having finished first in 2011 and 2012. In 2021, Mikkelsen became the drivers' champion in both the WRC-2 and the European Rally Championship.

Career
Mikkelsen has a broad background in sports. He has competed in slalom and giant slalom, and was a member of the national juniors' alpine skiing team. In 2003 and 2004, he competed in motocross, also representing the national juniors' team.

2006–2010: Ford
After turning 17 and getting a British driver's license, Mikkelsen started competing in rallies in the United Kingdom and Ireland. Driving a Ford Focus RS WRC, he won the Quinton Stages, the Coracle, the Plains, the Bulldog and the Cambrian Rally, as well as the Saaremaa Rally in Estonia. He finished 38th overall in 2007 in the famous Donegal International Rally in his Ford Focus, finishing almost an hour behind eventual winner Sébastien Loeb.

Mikkelsen debuted in the World Rally Championship at the 2006 Rally GB and retired from the 14th special stage after going off the road. In the 2007 season, he competed in eight WRC events, and also took part in the Irish Tarmac Championship and the Norwegian Rally Championship. His best WRC results were ninth at the 2007 Rally Ireland and tenth in Norway and Portugal.

For the 2008 season, Mikkelsen had some exclusive coaching from Ford's retired double world champion Marcus Grönholm. Even though having major problems with turbocharger on Friday's stages, he achieved the best result of his WRC career so far by claiming fifth in the 2008 Swedish Rally, beating Matthew Wilson's 2006 record of being the youngest driver ever to score points in a WRC event. He intended to compete in all of the championship rounds in Europe, whilst completing his final year in school.

During Rally Larvik in September 2009, Mikkelsen was involved in an accident, when he got a slide on his car and hit a 10-year-old spectator, killing her instantly.

In 2010, Mikkelsen competed in the Intercontinental Rally Challenge driving a Ford Fiesta S2000 with a best finish of second on the 2010 Rally Scotland. He placed seventh in the overall standings. Mikkelsen drove a Super 2000 car also on three WRC rounds, and won the SWRC class at the season-ending 2010 Wales Rally GB.

2011–2012: Škoda

Following a strong 2010 campaign, Mikkelsen signed with the Skoda UK Motorsport team for the 2011 IRC season.

During his 2011 season driving for Skoda UK Motorsport in the IRC, Mikkelsen were off to a rough start. The first rally of the season, Rally Monte-Carlo, Mikkelsen had to retire only after SS1. Sata Rallye Açores where a turning point of the season, where he placed second, his first ever podium in the IRC. Prior to the last rally of the season, Rally Cyprus, five drivers were fighting for the drivers championship. Mikkelsen, winning Rally Cyprus took home the title, being the youngest person ever to win the IRC.

Mikkelsen continued his dominance of the IRC in the 2012 season, claiming the drivers championship after winning at Azores and Romania plus collecting five second place finishes. Mikkelsen is the first ever to win the IRC (now ERC) two consecutive times.

2013–2016: Volkswagen

From 2013 to 2016, Mikkelsen competed for Volkswagen Motorsport II in their factory Polo WRC. He did not reach the podium during the 2013 season, but won several special stages, placing 10th in the overall standings. 2014 saw more favourable results, with three second placed finishes, and two third place results, he completed the year in an impressive third place in the championship overall standings. In 2015, he achieved his first rally victory in Spain, and seven third place results, giving him another third place in the world championship. Mikkelsen followed that by two more wins in Poland and Australia during the 2016 season, and two more second places, resulting in yet another third place in the championship overall. Mikkelsen had finished 3rd in the championship three times consecutively from 2014 to 2016. Volkswagen retired from WRC at the end of 2016, leaving Mikkelsen without a drive for 2017.

2017: Škoda, Citroën and Hyundai

In early 2017, Mikkelsen entered three rounds of the WRC-2 with a factory Škoda Fabia R5, winning the Monte Carlo Rally and Tour de Corse. He joined the Citroën World Rally Team in mid 2017, debuting at Italy with a Citroën C3 WRC. After finishing second in Germany, Mikkelsen signed a deal for 2018 with Hyundai Motorsport, joining close friend Thierry Neuville, Dani Sordo and Hayden Paddon. He finished fourth in Welsh Rally GB before the end of that year.

2018–2019: Hyundai Shell Mobis WRT

2018 started promisingly with third place in Sweden, but Andreas suffered a series of setbacks, and finished the year 6th place overall. 2019 was significantly better. Despite missing out or retiring from six of the fourteen WRC events that year, Mikkelsen scored one second place and two third places, to finish the season in 4th place overall. His contract with Hyundai was not renewed at the end of 2019, leaving Mikkelsen without a WRC drive.

2020: Pirelli tests and Eurosol Racing Team 
Mikkelsen was left without a drive for 2020 season, so at Rally Sardegna he co-drived for 2003 World Drivers' Champion Petter Solberg. They contested the rally in Shakedown and Power Stage using Saintéloc-prepared Citroen C3 WRC equipped with Pirelli tyres to be used for the 2021 season. At Rally Monza, together with Eurosol Racing Team he finished 6th in WRC-2 and won in WRC-3 category.

2021–2022: Toksport WRT and Škoda Motorsport

For 2021, Mikkelsen joined Toksport for a combined WRC-2 and ERC campaign, driving a Škoda Fabia R5/Rally2 evo. He become the first driver to win both WRC-2 and ERC title in the same year. He stayed with the team in 2022 and is currently leading the WRC-2 standings. Between the races, he also helped Škoda Motorsport to develop the new Škoda Fabia RS Rally2 and he drove it at the 2022 Bohemia Rally Mladá Boleslav as course car.

WRC victories

Racing record

Complete WRC results

PWRC results

SWRC results

WRC-2 results

WRC-3 results

Complete IRC results

ERC results

* Season still in progress.

Skiing career

Mikkelsen was an Alpine skier before concentrating on rallying.

References

External links 

eWRC-results.com profile

1989 births
Living people
World Rally Championship drivers
Intercontinental Rally Challenge drivers
Norwegian rally drivers
FIA Institute Young Driver Excellence Academy drivers
Audi Sport TT Cup drivers
Sportspeople from Oslo
Citroën Racing drivers
Hyundai Motorsport drivers
Volkswagen Motorsport drivers
Toksport WRT drivers
M-Sport drivers
Škoda Motorsport drivers